Brazilian commonly refers to:

 of or related to Brazil
 Brazilians, citizens of Brazil, or of Brazilian descent
 Brazilian Portuguese, the set of varieties of the Portuguese language native to Brazil
 Brazilian waxing, a style of bikini waxing
 Brazilian or Brazilian-cut bikini, a bikini with a bottom covering half or less of the buttocks
 "The Brazilian", a 1986 instrumental music piece by Genesis
 Mamelodi Sundowns F.C., a South African football club nicknamed The Brazilians

See also

 Brazil (disambiguation)
 Brasileiro, a 1992 album by Sergio Mendes
 Brazilian jiu-jitsu, a martial art and combat sport system
 Brazilian cuisine
 Churrasco, Brazilian barbecue
 Culture of Brazil
 Football in Brazil

Language and nationality disambiguation pages